Iuka (YTB-819) was a United States Navy .

Construction

The contract for Iuka was awarded 9 August 1971. She was laid down on 20 September 1972 at Marinette, Wisconsin, by Marinette Marine and launched 12 April 1973.

Operational history

Stricken from the Navy List 19 October 1995, Iuka was transferred to Other Government Agency 21 March 1996.

Was used as a training vessel for the Seamanship program at Tongue Point Job Corps Center, Astoria, OR until January of 2022.
Transferred to Pacific Defense Supply for Military Training, January 2022.

References

External links

 

Natick-class large harbor tugs
1973 ships